Bright Middleton Mends is a Ghanaian football player who last played as a forward for United SC. He was awarded the  most promising player for New Edubiase United in the Ghana Premier League. He later moved on to sign for Aizawl F.C. in 2016.

References

1992 births
Living people
Ghanaian footballers
Association football forwards
New Edubiase United F.C. players
Gokulam Kerala FC players
Aizawl FC players
Calcutta Football League players